Super Saver is a chain of grocery stores owned and operated by B&R Stores, Inc. This employee-owned Nebraska corporation operates exclusively in the retail grocery industry and has its corporate headquarters in Lincoln, Nebraska, United States.

The first B&R Stores-owned Super Saver store was opened in 1984 at 48th & O Streets in Lincoln. At the time of its opening, it was the largest retail grocery store in the state in terms of square footage (60,000 square feet). In 1993, the Company opened a store in Council Bluffs, Iowa, marking Super Saver's entrance into a market outside Lincoln. Growth continued for the Super Saver concept, and in 1999 B&R Stores purchased the Food-4-Less store in Columbus, Nebraska and the Festival of Foods store in Grand Island, Nebraska. A new Super Saver store at 27th & Pine Lake Road in Lincoln was completed in October 1999. An Omaha, Nebraska-area location was added in June 2000 with the opening of B&R's largest store, an  Super Saver at 144th & Stony Brook Boulevard in Millard, Nebraska.

B&R Stores was founded in 1964 by Russ Raybould and is owned by the Raybould family. During the past 50 years, the company has grown to include the Russ's Market, Super Saver, Save Best, along with the Grand Central Apple Market in Kearney, Nebraska, which the company acquired in 2008.

References

External links 
 

Supermarkets of the United States